Kahrizi syndrome (KHRZ) is an autosomal-recessive disease that is identified by mental retardation, cataracts, coloboma, kyphosis, and coarse facial features caused by a homozygous mutation in the SRD5A3 gene.

Signs and symptoms 
Human traits related to Kahrizi syndrome are cataracts, wide nasal bridge, severe intellectual disability, motor delay, thick lower lip vermilion, capillary hemangioma, iris coloboma, bulbous nose, knee and elbow flexion contracture, and thoracic kyphosis.

Symptoms of Kahrizi Syndrome

 Head and Neck eyes:
 Iris Coloboma
 Cataracts
 Skeletal Spine:
 Thoracic Kyphosis 
 Head and Neck Mouth:
 Thick Lips 
 Skeletal: 
 Joint Contractures
 Head and Neck Nose: 
 Bulbous Nose 
 Broad Nasal Bridge 
 Neurological Central Nervous System: 
 Delayed Motor Development
 Severe Mental Retardation
 Speech Never Acquired 
 Skeletal Limbs: 
 Knee Contractures 
  Skin Nails Hair Skin:
 Capillary hemangioma

Clinical features 
Three Iranian siblings born with syndrome characterized by severe mental retardation, cataracts with onset in late adolescence, kyphosis, contracture of large joints, bulbous nose with broad nasal bridge, and thick lips. At age 8, all 3 siblings had developed severe thoracic kyphosis but after several skeletal X-rays revealed no vertebral abnormalities. One sibling had left iris coloboma, and another sibling had bilateral iris coloboma. The oldest brother had a large capillary hemangioma on the left cheek. At the time of the report, the siblings where 45,42, and 40 years old. At this age, none of the patients had learned to speak, and showed a late motor development. Both parents came from the same village in Iran and was assumed they were possibly related, but linkage could not be determined. Kahrizi syndrome could possibly be a cause of third-cousin genetic disorder. No studied have yet been proven.

Phenotype and gene relationship 

 Phenotype MIM number: 612713
 Inheritance: Autosomal Recessive
 Phenotype Mapping Key: 3
 Gene/Locus: SRD5A3
 Gene/Locus MIM number:  611715

References

Rare genetic syndromes